The Poke is a British satirical website. It was launched in 2002 as a fanzine distributed at the Edinburgh Festival and independent music stores. The website is known for producing viral videos, which are often Auto-Tune edits of British current affairs.

History
The Poke began as a fanzine with a circulation of 50,000 that was sold in music shops across the United Kingdom and at the annual Edinburgh Festival. Later becoming an Internet-only publication, the website gained some popularity when it was featured as an "Internet Pick Of The Week" on The Guardians website, in which it was compared to "a British version of The Onion crossed with Private Eye". The site was named 'Website of the day' by pocket-lint.com on 19 January 2012.

The red-top look of the site means there have been cases of the site's fictional, satirical news stories being misinterpreted as real news items. In January 2012, a number of French news organisations including Le Parisien and L’Express reported on an August 2011 article by The Poke about a BBC Sign language interpreter being fired from her job for 'fabricating news' as a genuine story. French radio broadcasters RTL and France Info also reported the story as real, and television broadcaster Canal + featuring the fictitious 'scandal' on an evening news programme.

In December 2022, The Poke was acquired by Digitalbox plc for an undisclosed sum.

The Leveson Enquiry Musical  
The Poke created an Auto-Tuned version of the Leveson Inquiry featuring the sampled testimonies of Rupert Murdoch, Rebekah Brooks and Andy Coulson. The video was featured in The Guardian's Viral Video Chart.

Nick Clegg Apology Song
An Auto-Tuned remix uploaded in September 2012 to YouTube of Nick Clegg's apology over going back on his promise to oppose a rise in tuition fees saw the website rise to national publicity, with the video becoming an Internet phenomenon. Following a request by the website, Clegg allowed the song to be released as a single on iTunes, provided that all proceeds were donated to the Sheffield Children's Hospital. The track was released on Friday 21 September, and entered the weekly UK Singles Chart at number 136 two days later.

Brown Windsor soup
A satirical can of Brown Windsor soup features a likeness of Queen Elizabeth II and is part of the "Jubilee Collection," available for about £40 and made "directly from the sewage outflow of Windsor Castle."

Kern's Corner 
In 2017 The Poke featured comedian Lee Kern as a guest columnist. His column Kern's Corner explored both silly and satirical issues such as his crippling addiction to Chinese takeaway food, Internet clickbait, the comment sections on porn websites, identity politics, Islam and Chips (French Fries) and who is to blame for the state of the world.

See also
 List of satirical magazines
 List of satirical news websites
 List of satirical television news programs

References

External links
 

British satirical websites
Internet properties established in 2002
2002 establishments in the United Kingdom